Dr. László Mendelényi (7 February 1877 – ?) was a Hungarian jurist, who served as the last Crown Prosecutor of Hungary in 1944.

References
 Révai Lexikon

1877 births
Hungarian jurists
Year of death missing